Echo is an upcoming American television series created by Marion Dayre for the streaming service Disney+, based on the Marvel Comics character of the same name. It is intended to be part of the Marvel Cinematic Universe (MCU) produced by Marvel Studios, sharing continuity with the films of the franchise, and is a spin-off from the series Hawkeye (2021). It sees Maya Lopez return to her hometown where she must come to terms with her past, reconnect with her Native American roots, and embrace her family and community. Dayre serves as head writer for the series with Sydney Freeland leading the directing team. The series is also produced by 20th Television.

Alaqua Cox reprises her role as Maya Lopez / Echo from Hawkeye, with Chaske Spencer, Tantoo Cardinal, Devery Jacobs, Cody Lightning, Graham Greene, Zahn McClarnon, Vincent D'Onofrio, and Charlie Cox also starring. Development of the spin-off began by March 2021, with Etan and Emily Cohen attached as head writers, and Alaqua Cox confirmed to be returning. The series was formally announced in November 2021, when Dayre was revealed to be serving as head writer, with Freeland set to direct by March 2022. Filming occurred from late April to late August 2022, taking place in the Atlanta metropolitan area including Atlanta, Peachtree City, Social Circle, and Grantville, Georgia. In May, Marvel revealed further cast members and that Catriona McKenzie would also direct for the series.

Echo is expected to premiere on Disney+ as part of Phase Five of the MCU.

Premise 
Following the events of Hawkeye (2021) in New York City, Maya Lopez returns to her hometown in Oklahoma, where she must come to terms with her past, reconnect with her Native American roots, and embrace her family and community.

Cast and characters 

 Alaqua Cox as Maya Lopez / Echo: A deaf Native American and the former commander of the Tracksuit Mafia who can perfectly copy another person's movements.

 Zahn McClarnon as William Lopez: Maya's deceased father and a former commander of the Tracksuit Mafia.
 Vincent D'Onofrio as Wilson Fisk / Kingpin:A crime lord in New York who is Lopez's adoptive uncle and the man responsible for her father's death. After he was shot by Lopez during the events of Hawkeye (2021), Fisk begins to wear an eyepatch on one eye; in the comics, he was blinded in both eyes.
 Charlie Cox as Matt Murdock / Daredevil: A blind lawyer from Hell's Kitchen, New York who leads a double life as a masked vigilante, and is searching for a former ally.

Additionally, Chaske Spencer, Tantoo Cardinal, Devery Jacobs, Cody Lightning, and Graham Greene have been cast in undisclosed starring roles.

Episodes 

Sydney Freeland directs the first episode and others, with Catriona McKenzie also directing episodes of the series.

Production

Development 
In December 2020, Alaqua Cox was announced as having been cast as the Marvel Comics character Maya Lopez / Echo in Marvel Studios' Disney+ series Hawkeye (2021). By March 2021, Marvel Studios was in early development on a spin-off from Hawkeye centered on Cox's Lopez for Disney+, with Etan Cohen and Emily Cohen set to write and executive produce. During the Disney+ Day event in November 2021, the series was officially announced as Echo, and Marion Dayre was serving as head writer by then instead of the Cohens. Bert & Bertie, who directed the Hawkeye episode "Echoes" in which Lopez is introduced, did not believe they would be involved with the spin-off series and felt it would be appropriate for someone in the Native American community to further tell the character's story. In March 2022, Sydney Freeland shared a casting call on her Instagram page, indicating her involvement in the series as a director. Marvel Studios confirmed Freeland as a director in May, while also announcing that Catriona McKenzie would direct episodes of the series. Freeland directs the first episode and others. Marvel Studios' Kevin Feige, Louis D'Esposito, Victoria Alonso, Brad Winderbaum, Stephen Broussard, and Richie Palmer serve as executive producers along with Dayre and Jason Gavin, while Freeland serves as a co-executive producer. 20th Television also produces the series.

Writing 
A writers' room for the series had been formed by the time development of the project was revealed in March 2021. In addition to Dayre, writers for the series include Shoshannah Stern, Josh Feldman, Rebecca Roanhorse, Bobby Wilson, Steven Paul Judd, Jason Gavin, Ken Kristensen, Dara Resnik, Jessica Mecklenburg, Kaitlyn Jeffers, Paloma Lamb, and Ellen Morton. At least two episodes had been written by mid-February 2022, while writing for the other episodes was still continuing. Location manager Ryan Schaetzle said the story would focus on a small town. Marvel said the series would explore the consequences of Echo's actions in Hawkeye and reveal her origin story. Matt Murdock / Daredevil's inclusion in the series sees him searching for a former ally, which has been reported to be Jessica Jones.

Casting 
Alaqua Cox was expected to reprise her role in the series with the reveal of its development in March 2021, which was confirmed with the series' official announcement in November 2021 for Disney+ Day. By August 2021, casting for the series was underway, with Marvel Studios looking to cast deaf Native American or Latinx women. In April 2022, Vincent D'Onofrio and Charlie Cox were revealed to be involved with the series, reprising their roles as Wilson Fisk / Kingpin and Matt Murdock / Daredevil from prior MCU media. By the end of the month, Devery Jacobs was cast in an undisclosed role, reported to be a lead of the series named Julie, which Deadline Hollywood described as "resilient and strong willed". In May 2022, Marvel confirmed Jacobs's casting and announced that Chaske Spencer, Tantoo Cardinal, Cody Lightning, and Graham Greene would also star in the series, with Zahn McClarnon reprising his role as Echo's father William Lopez from Hawkeye. Cox and D'Onofrio were confirmed to be returning for the series in July 2022.

By April 2022, Marvel Studios was looking to cast background performers and extras, particularly Native Americans, for two waves of filming. The first group of around 30 people would portray a "core group" of townspeople, while background casting for pow wow dancers and singers was also underway.

Design 
Stacy Caballero serves as the costume designer for the series, after previously working on the MCU films Thor: Ragnarok (2017) and Black Panther: Wakanda Forever (2022) as an assistant costume designer.

Filming 
Principal photography began on April 21, 2022, throughout the Atlanta metropolitan area, in Atlanta, and was set to occur along the Great Walton Railroad in Social Circle, Georgia that month, with Freeland and McKenzie directing. Kira Kelly served as the cinematographer for Freeland. The series was filmed using the working titles Grasshopper and Whole Branzino. Filming was also set to occur in and around Peachtree City, Georgia from late April to late August 2022. Filming was previously expected to begin in February 2022, as well as in early April. Filming establishing shots for two episodes took place in Grantville, Georgia from May 16 to 20, on various streets in the town, the Grantville water tower, and Bonnie Castle. Filming outside Atlanta occurred with the first group of extras around June 1, with the second group for three weeks in July, and with the dancers and singers extras for around two-to-three weeks in July. Filming occurred over 92 days, and wrapped on August 26, 2022.

Marketing 
Alaqua Cox, D'Onofrio, Jacobs, Greene, Cody Lightning, and Chaske Spencer presented the first footage of the series at the 2022 D23 Expo. Aidan Kelley from Collider said the footage perfectly set up the series' tone and made it clear that Lopez's Native American heritage would be prominent throughout. Kelley also said the footage showed Lopez being "a total badass with an incredible performance from Alaqua Cox who just exudes charisma without uttering a single word".

Release 
Echo was originally scheduled to be released on Disney+ in mid-2023, before Dayre stated in December 2022 that the series would likely be released around a year from then, indicating a December 2023 premiere. By February 2023, the series was reportedly unlikely to premiere that year as Disney and Marvel Studios were re-evaluating their content output. It is expected to be part of Phase Five of the MCU.

Future 
In November 2022, D'Onofrio stated that Echo would lead into the events of the Disney+ series Daredevil: Born Again, with D'Onofrio and Cox reprising their respective roles as Wilson Fisk / Kingpin and Matt Murdock / Daredevil.

References

External links 
 
 

2020s American crime television series
2020s American drama television series

American action television series
American television spin-offs
Disney+ original programming
English-language television shows
Marvel Cinematic Universe: Phase Five television series
Serial drama television series
Superheroine television shows
Television series by 20th Century Fox Television
Television series by Marvel Studios
Television shows about deaf people
Television shows about Native Americans
Television shows filmed in Atlanta
Television shows filmed in Georgia (U.S. state)
Television shows set in Oklahoma
Upcoming television series